Gebauer is a German surname. Notable people with the surname include:

 Christian Gebauer (born 1993), Austrian footballer
 Ernst Gebauer (1782–1865), German painter
 Ferenc Gebauer (1888–1958), Austrian-born Hungarian firearms designer and pilot
 François-René Gebauer (1773–1845), French composer and bassoonist, brother of Michel-Joseph Gebauer
 Jan Gebauer (1838–1907), Czech academic
 Johan Christian Gebauer (1808–1884), Danish composer and organist
 Josef Gebauer (1942–2004), Czech historian
 Judy GeBauer, American playwright
 Michel-Joseph Gebauer (1763–1812), French composer, brother of François René Gebauer
 Paul Gebauer ( early 1900s), German Olympic water polo player
 Steve Gebauer (born 1981), American curler
 Thomas Gebauer (born 1983), German footballer

See also 
 Neugebauer
 Richards-Gebaur Memorial Airport

German-language surnames
Occupational surnames